The 2012–13 TNM Super League was the 27th season of the Super League of Malawi, the top professional league for association football clubs in Malawi since its establishment in 1986. It started on 26 May 2012 and was ended on 22 February 2013. Silver Strikers were the defending champions. The Bankers successfully defended their Super League title at goal difference a week before the end of the season.

Teams 
Fifteen teams compete in this season: the top twelve teams from the previous season and three promoted teams from the regional leagues. Kamuzu Barracks (Central Region Football League), Bvumbwe Research (Southern Region Football League) and Kabwafu United (Northern Region Football League) entered as the three promoted teams, instead of the three relegated teams from previous season, Cobbe Barracks, Zomba United and Embangweni United.

Stadiums and locations

League table

References

External links
Official Website

2012
Malawi